Böyük or Boyuk may refer to:

Böyük Şamlıq (also, Bëyuk Shamlyk) is a village in the Tovuz Rayon of Azerbaijan
Böyük Əmili (also, Bëyuk Emili) is a village and municipality in the Qabala Rayon of Azerbaijan
Böyük Alatəmir (also, Alatemur-Beyuk, Bëyuk Alatemir, and Beyuk-Alateymur) is a village and municipality in the Qakh Rayon of Azerbaijan
Böyük Bəhmənli (also, Bëyuk Bekhmanli and Bëyuk-Bekhmenli) is a village and most populous municipality in the Fizuli Rayon of Azerbaijan
Böyük Dəhnə (also, Bëyuk Dakhna, Beyuk-Degne, Beyuk-Dekhna, Beyyuk-Dakhna, and Byuyuk-Dakhne) is a village and municipality in the Shaki Rayon of Azerbaijan
Böyük Dəkkə (also, Bëyuk Dekkya) is a village in the Zardab Rayon of Azerbaijan
Böyük Göyüşlü (also, Bëyuk Gëyushlyu) is a village and municipality in the Barda Rayon of Azerbaijan
Böyük Galadərəsi (also, Böyük Qala dərəsi, Böyük Qaladərəsi, Mets Shen, Metskaladeresi, and Metsqaladərəsi) is a village in the Shusha Rayon of Azerbaijan
Böyük Gilətağ (also, Bëyuk-Gilyatag and Gilatakh) is a village in the Zangilan Rayon of Azerbaijan
Böyük Həmyə (also, Arab Gam’ya and Bëyuk Gam’ya) is a village and municipality in the Siazan Rayon of Azerbaijan
Böyük Külatan (also, Bëyuk Këlatan, Böyük Kolatan, and Kyulatan) is a village in the Masally Rayon of Azerbaijan
Böyük Kəhrizli (also, Bëyuk Kyagrizli, Beyuk-Khagrizli, and Kyagrizli-Nasirbeyli) is a village and municipality in the Aghjabadi Rayon of Azerbaijan
Böyük Kəngərli (also, Bëyuk Kengerli, Beyuk-Kengerli, and Böyük Gängärli) is a village and municipality in the Kurdamir Rayon of Azerbaijan
Böyük Kəsik (formerly, V.İ.Lenin) is a village and municipality in the Agstafa Rayon of Azerbaijan
Böyük Mərcanlı (also, Bëyuk Mardzhanly) is a village in the Jabrayil Rayon of Azerbaijan
Böyük Muruq (also, Bëyuk Murug and Beyuk-Murukh) is a village and municipality in the Qusar Rayon of Azerbaijan
Böyük Oyun (English: "The Great Game") is an Azerbaijani football rivalry involving two of the most successful clubs in Azerbaijan
Böyük Pirəli (also, Beyuk-Pirelli, Beyuk-Piraly, and Bëyuk Pirali) is a village and municipality in the Qabala Rayon of Azerbaijan
Böyük Qışlaq (also, Böyükqışlaq, Bëyuk Kyshlak, Beyuk-Kyshlag, and Böyükqıslaq) is a village and municipality in the Tovuz Rayon of Azerbaijan
Böyük Qəcər (also, Bëyuk Kadzhar and Böyük Qacar) is a village and municipality in the Barda Rayon of Azerbaijan
Böyük Qaramurad (also, Bëyuk-Karamurad) is a village and municipality in the Gadabay Rayon of Azerbaijan
Böyük Söyüdlü (also, Bëyuk Sëyudlyu, Beyuk-Segutly, and Beyuk-Sogyutlyu) is a village and municipality in the Oghuz Rayon of Azerbaijan
Böyük Tağlar (also, Mets T’aghlar, Mets Taghk, and Metstaglar) is a village in the Khojavend Rayon of Azerbaijan
Böyük Xınıslı, a village and municipality in the Shamakhi Rayon of Azerbaijan
Böyük Xoşdarlı, a village in the municipality of Yanıqlı in the Tovuz Rayon of Azerbaijan
Böyük Xocavar, a village and municipality in the Masally Rayon of Azerbaijan
Boyuk Alagol (Azerbaijani: Böyük Alagöl) is a lake of Azerbaijan
Boyuk Khanlu, a village in the Ardabil Province of Iran
Boyuk Shor Highway (Azerbaijani: Böyük Şor yolu) is a highway in Baku, Azerbaijan
Qurudərə, Böyük Qaramurad (also, Kurudere) is a village in the Gadabay Rayon of Azerbaijan